Crater National Forest was established by the U.S. Forest Service in Oregon on July 1, 1908 with  from portions of Cascade, Klamath and, Siskiyou National Forests as well as all of Ashland National Forest.  On July 18, 1915 part of Paulina National Forest was added, and on July 9, 1932 the forest's name was changed to Rogue River National Forest.

References

External links
Forest History Society
Listing of the National Forests of the United States and Their Dates (from the Forest History Society website) Text from Davis, Richard C., ed. Encyclopedia of American Forest and Conservation History. New York: Macmillan Publishing Company for the Forest History Society, 1983. Vol. II, pp. 743-788.

Former National Forests of Oregon
Rogue River-Siskiyou National Forest
1908 establishments in Oregon
Protected areas established in 1908
1932 disestablishments in Oregon